Kenneth Branker (born 23 October 1932) is a Barbadian cricketer. He played in two first-class matches for the Barbados cricket team in 1951/52 and 1955/56.

See also
 List of Barbadian representative cricketers

References

External links
 

1932 births
Living people
Barbadian cricketers
Barbados cricketers
People from Saint Michael, Barbados